, or , is the technical research company under the Japan Railways group of companies.

Overview
RTRI was established in its current form in 1986 just before Japanese National Railways (JNR) was privatised and split into separate JR group companies. It conducts research on everything related to trains, railways and their operation. It is funded by the government and private rail companies.  It works both on developing new railway technology, such as magnetic levitation, and on improving the safety and economy of current technology.

Its research areas include earthquake detection and alarm systems, obstacle detection on level crossings, improving adhesion between train wheels and tracks, reducing energy usage, noise barriers and preventing vibrations.

RTRI is the main developer in the Japanese SCMaglev program.

Offices and test facilities

Main office
 844 Shin-Kokusai Bldg. 3-4-1 Marunouchi, Chiyoda-ku, Tokyo 100-0005, Japan

Research facilities
 Kunitachi Institute - 2-8-38 Hikari-cho, Kokubunji-shi, Tokyo, 185-8540, Japan
 Wind Tunnel Technical Center, Maibara, Shiga
 Shiozawa Snow Testing Station, Minami-Uonuma, Niigata
 Hino Civil Engineering Testing Station, Hino, Tokyo
 Gatsugi Anti-Salt Testing Station, Sanpoku, Niigata

Gauge Change Train
The RTRI is developing a variable gauge system, called the "Gauge Change Train", to allow  Shinkansen trains to access  lines of the original rail network.

Publications
 Japan Railway & Technical Review
 Quarterly Report of RTRI - Print:  Online:

See also

 British Rail Research Division
 German Centre for Rail Traffic Research
 Hydrail

References

External links
 

Rail transport in Japan
Railway infrastructure companies
Engineering research institutes